Tennie Beatrice Thomas Rogers (August 1, 1927 – January 22, 2009) was a perennial candidate for national office, having run in Republican primaries for United States President three times, and one time for United States Congress.  In 1992 she was on more state ballots than any previous female Republican candidate for president.  She was also the author of Standing Up: Rogers For U.S. President, an autobiography and chronicle of her first two attempts at the presidency and her intention for the 2000 election.  She is the mother of Evelyn L. Rogers, another candidate. She died on January 22, 2009.

Congressional campaigns

In 2000 she ran for the Republican nomination for Oklahoma's 2nd Congressional District in the U.S. House of Representatives, winning 266 votes, coming in 6th of seven candidates, losing to Andy Ewing.  Ewing lost to Brad Carson in the general election.

In 2002 she ran for the Republican nomination for Oklahoma's 4th Congressional District (map) winning 648 votes, coming in 4th of six candidates, losing to Tom Cole who won with 21,789 votes and then went on to win the general election.

Meanwhile, her daughter Evelyn L Rogers, a librarian at Tulsa Community College ran for the 3rd Congressional District in 1996, and the 1st Congressional District in 2000, 2001, 2002, and 2004.

Presidential campaigns

1992
In 1992 she was on nine State Republican primary ballots, winning 7,677 votes.  She was the first female Republican candidate to have been on so many ballots, exceeding former Senator Margaret Chase Smith and is one of only approximately ten women to have ever been a Republican candidate for president.

1996
In 1996, she was on the Republican primary ballot in New Hampshire and Mississippi, earning just 12 votes in the former  and 35 in the latter.

Following this election, she wrote a book, Standing Up: Rogers For U.S. President, that would serve as both autobiography and campaign tool for her anticipated third attempt at the presidency.

2000
In 2000 she once again ran, but this time failed to get on any ballots for President, faring better in her run for Congress as mentioned above.

External links

Notes and references

1927 births
2009 deaths
American autobiographers
Oklahoma Republicans
Female candidates for President of the United States
Candidates in the 1992 United States presidential election
Candidates in the 1996 United States presidential election
Candidates in the 2000 United States presidential election
20th-century American politicians
Women autobiographers
20th-century American women politicians
21st-century American women